Île Frégate is a small, uninhabited island in the Caribbean Sea located off the north coast of Saint Barthélemy, an overseas collectivity of France. Île Frégate is situated within the Nature Reserve of Saint Bartholomew, which was established in 1996 with the objective of conserving coral reefs, sea grass beds and marine life.

Geography
Île Frégate is an uninhabited cay in the Caribbean. Situated north of Saint Barthélemy, it is one of its satellite islands. Due to its shape, Île Frégate has been described as "twin islets". According to sailing information, traversing through the channel between the two islets should be avoided. Île Frégate is situated within the Réserve naturelle nationale de Saint-Barthélemy, which also includes Gros Îlets and Pain de Sucre; the waters surrounding the islets Fourchue, and Île Toc Vers; and part of Colombier bay. Situated on the windward side of the marine reserve, it is noted for sea life which can be viewed while snorkeling.

Flora and fauna

The high islet features grass and bush flora. Its protected area measures . Bird life on the island has included a frigatebird colony, although this has been significantly diminished due to the removal of bird eggs. According to the International Union for Conservation of Nature, Iguana delicatissima or Lesser Antillean Green Iguana, and West Indian Iguana have been found on Île Frégate. Sphaerodactylus sputator  (Leeward Banded Sphaero)  was recorded on the island in 2012.

References

Bibliography

Islands of Saint Barthélemy
Uninhabited islands of France